Yarraville railway station is located on the Werribee and Williamstown lines in Victoria, Australia. It serves the inner-western Melbourne suburb of Yarraville, and it opened on 20 November 1871 as South Footscray.

History

Yarraville station opened on 20 November 1871, twelve years after the line from Footscray was extended to Newport. Like the suburb itself, the station was named after the Yarraville estate, which was developed by Biers, Henningham & Co. Land sales began in 1859.

In 1892, the present station buildings were provided, replacing timber station buildings that were destroyed by fire in 1890. The station opened to goods traffic in 1883 and, in 1893, a goods shed that was originally at South Morang was relocated to Yarraville. In 1912, an extension of the yard was provided at the up end. By July 1969, the station was closed to goods traffic, with the goods shed demolished shortly after. In 1970, an overpass at nearby Somerville Road opened and, in 1991, the goods yard was removed. Interlocked crossing gates remained at the Anderson Street level crossing until 1995, when they were fixed in the open position and replaced by boom barriers.

A signal box, which was closed in 1996, is located at the down end of Platform 1. In 1997, a pedestrian subway on the station side of Anderson Street was filled in and replaced by pedestrian gates.

Platforms and services

Yarraville has two side platforms. It is served by Werribee and Williamstown trains.

Platform 1:
  all stations services to Flinders Street and Frankston
  all stations services to Flinders Street and Frankston

Platform 2:
  all stations services to Laverton via Altona (weekdays only); all stations services to Werribee
  all stations services to Williamstown

Transport links

CDC Melbourne operates one route to and from Yarraville station, under contract to Public Transport Victoria:
 : to Highpoint Shopping Centre

Transit Systems Victoria operates two routes to and from Yarraville station, under contract to Public Transport Victoria:
 : to Kingsville
 : to Newport station

References

External links
 
 Melway map at street-directory.com.au

Railway stations in Melbourne
Railway stations in Australia opened in 1871
Railway stations in the City of Maribyrnong